Vernon Hill (1887–1972), born in Halifax, Yorkshire, England, was a sculptor, lithographer, illustrator and draughtsman.

He began his work in print-making and lithography, and branched out into other artistic forms, such as sculpture. He illustrated several works and created etchings. His more notable works were commissions from Sir Edward Maufe for interior and exterior architectural sculptures on Maufe's buildings, including Guildford Cathedral, the Runnymede Memorial and several churches.

He died in 1972.

Early life
Vernon Hill was born in 1887 in Halifax, Yorkshire. He began formal training in print-making at an early age; at the age 13 he was apprenticed to a lithographer. In about 1908, at the age of 21, Hill moved to London and took up poster illustration, working under John Hassall, a poster designer and illustrator.

From 1909 to 1914 Hill received commissions for work as an illustrator on various projects. He created Art Nouveau illustrations for an Arcadian Calendar for 1910 in 1909, Stephen Phillips' The New Inferno in 1911 and for Richard Pearse Chope's Ballads Weird and Wonderful the following year. In 1912 one of his works was exhibited at the Royal Academy. His etchings were described by Campbell Fine Art as follows:
The distinctive allegorical etchings of Vernon Hill are all now scarce. His highly evocative work appears to have evolved entirely independently from the trends of his time, although overtones of the mysticism which so influenced Frederick Carter and Austin Osman Spare can be traced in some of his works.

Notable commissions

His most notable work as a sculptor is to be seen on various buildings by Sir Edward Maufe, who regularly commissioned Hill.

Guildford Cathedral

Some of Hill's finest work can be seen at Guildford Cathedral in Guildford, Surrey. Apart from the reliefs on the south door entrance he carved the angels on the sedilia inside the cathedral, as well as the tongues of flame on the pulpit and lectern. He also carved the arms of Bishop Greig over the inside of the sacristy door and the figure of Saint Ursula over the inside of St Ursula's Porch.

At the east door of the south porch (on either side of the central buttress pier in the south transept) are two magnificent bronze doors set under two arches which feature Vernon Hill's reliefs. These are depictions of various occupations, of both men and women. The men's occupations are on the right-hand door and include sowing, woodcutting, fishing, hunting, shepherding and ploughing; on the left-hand door are depicted women's traditional occupations including milking, spinning, and teaching.

Runnymede Memorial

Hill sculpted the Air Forces Memorial at Runnymede, designed by Maufe. Overlooking the Thames Valley, the memorial commemorates the more than 20,000 Royal Air Force servicemen and -women who died during World War II and have no known graves. The panels of inscriptions bear their names.

Among Hill's works are the architectural sculptures of Courage, Victory and Justice, which adorn the entry to the shrine on the north side of the triple arched portico by the cloisters.

St Columba's Church, London

Maufe was the architect for the re-building of St Columba's Church, Pont Street, London, which had been destroyed in 1941 during World War II. Hill provided interior and exterior stone sculptures for the construction between 1950 and 1955. Maufe described the finished work as "of an especial beauty."

St John's College, Cambridge
Also commissioned by Maufe, Hill completed an architectural sculpture of the arms of St John's College, Cambridge, for the north side of North Court.

Church of St Thomas the Apostle, Hanwell
Hill sculpted several works out of Weldon stone for Maufe's church of St Thomas the Apostle, Hanwell. These included a sculpture of doves over the north door and one of two birds eating a bunch of grapes, depicting the Communion, over the west door. He also carved a Virgin and Child and a font. The font includes symbols for Christ, such as the ΙΧΘΥΣ cypher and an image of a fish. He also made a sculpture of Saint Christopher.

Works

Exhibitions

Hill exhibited:
1927 - Multiple works at Leicester Galleries: Sculpture, Drawings and Etchings by Vernon Hill
1928 - Multiple works at Leeds City Art Gallery, Yorkshire Artists' Exhibition
1930 - The Awakening at Leeds City Art Gallery, Yorkshire Artists' Exhibition

Notes

References

External links
Vernon Hill works, images and files at The National Archives.
 The Art of Vernon Hill, Spirit of the Ages site
 The Arcadian Calendar images
 
 Justice, Victory and Courage sculptures, Runnymede
 St Columba's Church of Scotland: St Columba with crane
 St John's College: coat of arms with yales
 St Thomas the Apostle, Hanwell - images
 Stephen Graham, World Traveler. Painting by Hill

1882 births
1972 deaths
English sculptors
English male sculptors
British architectural sculptors
20th-century British sculptors
Art Nouveau sculptors
Art Nouveau illustrators
English illustrators
People from Halifax, West Yorkshire